Pope John Paul II Catholic High School is a private, Roman Catholic  high school in Slidell, Louisiana, United States. It is located in the Roman Catholic Archdiocese of New Orleans.

Background 
Pope John Paul II Catholic High School was established in 1980, under the leadership of Archbishop Philip Hannan.
The first Principal of Pope John Paul II (PJP) was Glenn Gennaro. Since then, there have been seven principals: James Klassen, Lawrence Keller, Carmen Schexnaildre, Richard Berkowitz, Martha Mundine, Nicole Alvarez, Douglas Triche and the present principal Kimberlie Kilroy.

Academics 
PJP offers a college-preparatory standards based curriculum interwoven with the Catholic Identity Standards prescribed by the U.S.C.C.B. In addition to its basic college-prep classes, PJP offers an array of Advanced Placement, dual enrollment and virtual courses to suit any type of student.

Extracurricular activities 
PJP offers a wide array of extracurricular activities to suit every possible interest of its students.

Clubs include: National Honors Society, 
Student Council, History Club, 
Environmental Club, Math Club, Mu Alpha Theta, 
Foreign Languages Club, Fine Arts Club, Choir, 
Band, Chess Club, Students Against Substance 
Abuse, Speech & Debate Club, Catholic Athletes for 
Christ, Liturgy Team, Retreat Team, Extraordinary 
Ministers of Holy Communion, Adoration Team, 
Sanctity of Life Club and Media Club.

Athletics
Pope John Paul II Catholic athletics competes in the LHSAA.

Athletic offerings include:
 Boys: football, swimming, cross country, power lifting, soccer, basketball, baseball, golf, track & field, dance team and cheerleading.
 Girls: volleyball, swimming, cross country, power lifting, soccer, basketball, softball, golf, track & field, dance team and cheerleading.

Notable alumni 
 Richard Fontaine - foreign policy expert, 
 Taryn Terrell - model, WWE entertainer

References

External links 
 

Catholic secondary schools in New Orleans
Schools in St. Tammany Parish, Louisiana
Educational institutions established in 1980
1980 establishments in Louisiana
Slidell, Louisiana